CalyxOS is an operating system for smartphones based on Android with mostly free and open-source software.  It is produced by the Calyx Institute as part of its mission to "defend online privacy, security and accessibility."

CalyxOS preserves the Android security model, using Android's Verified Boot system of cryptographic signing of the operating system, and running with a locked boot loader.

History 
The Calyx Institute annual reports state CalyxOS was publicly launched during their 2018-2019 fiscal year. Inspiration included Tails and Qubes OS, and goals were said to be "completely open source", removing proprietary Google tracking, and including apps Tor, Signal and CalyxVPN for increased privacy.

CalyxOS supports Pixel phones Pixel 3 and newer. In April 2022, CalyxOS announced Android 12L for testing on Fairphone 4, and OnePlus 8T, 9, and 9 Pro. However, in May 2022, CalyxOS announced OnePlus builds were pulled because of a bootloader "relock issue". As of July 2022, according to CalyxOS the OnePlus relock issue had not been resolved.

Software

Reception 
CalyxOS was added to AlternativeTo in June 2020. CalyxOS F-Droid repositories are included in F-Droid's "Known Repositories" list. Phones with CalyxOS preinstalled are being sold. GoFOSS.net published a CalyxOS review and installation guide.

In October 2020, Moritz Tremmel reviewed CalyxOS. A month later, Tremmel explained why he preferred CalyxOS over LineageOS. A year later in September 2021, Tremmel further explained how CalyxOS was different from other ROMs because it did not require as much "fiddling". Rahul Nambiampurath, writing for MakeUseOf in March 2021, termed CalyxOS, "[one of the] best [Android] ROMs for privacy ... offers the perfect middle ground between convenience and privacy". In August 2021, Android Authority wrote CalyxOS "puts privacy and security into the hands of everyday users."

In a review in February 2023, the Kuketz Security blog said CalyxOS "offers a coherent overall package that should give users who want to (strongly) reduce their dependency on Google a good start" and said the integrated Datura Firewall works well. However, it criticized some previous delayed security updates and said the website does not "quite match what the present analysis revealed" regarding the information given to Google.

References

See also 

 Comparison of mobile operating systems
 List of custom Android distributions
 Security-focused operating system
 Guardian Project

Android (operating system) software
ARM operating systems
Computing platforms
Custom Android firmware
Embedded Linux distributions
Free and open-source Android software
Linux distributions
Linux distributions without systemd
Mobile Linux
Operating system families
Software using the Apache license